Agustín Alejandro Sosa (born 29 August 2000) is an Argentine professional footballer who plays as a right-back for Temperley.

Club career
Sosa's career started with Temperley. His first senior appearance arrived on 26 February 2018 during a goalless draw in the Primera División with Newell's Old Boys, which was the first of a further six appearances in the 2017–18 season as the club were relegated to Primera B Nacional. After eight matches in 2018–19, Sosa departed on loan to Primera B Metropolitana for 2019–20 with Talleres. Twelve appearances followed. August 2020 saw Sosa agree a loan move to Spanish football with Don Benito. He made his Segunda División B debut on 25 October against Badajoz; playing the full duration of a 2–0 loss.

International career
In March 2018, Sosa received a call-up from Sebastián Beccacece for training with the Argentina U19s.

Personal life
Sosa's brothers, Franco and Leandro, are fellow professional footballers.

Career statistics
.

References

External links

2000 births
Living people
Footballers from Buenos Aires
Argentine footballers
Association football defenders
Argentine expatriate footballers
Argentine Primera División players
Primera Nacional players
Primera B Metropolitana players
Segunda División B players
Club Atlético Temperley footballers
Talleres de Remedios de Escalada footballers
CD Don Benito players
Expatriate footballers in Spain
Argentine expatriate sportspeople in Spain